The anterior superior alveolar nerve (or anterior superior dental nerve), is a branch of the infraorbital nerve, itself a branch of the maxillary nerve (V2). It branches from the infraorbital nerve within the infraorbital canal before the infraorbital nerve exits through the infraorbital foramen. It descends in a canal in the anterior wall of the maxillary sinus, and divides into branches which supply the incisor and canine teeth.

It communicates with the middle superior alveolar nerve, and gives off a nasal branch, which passes through a minute canal in the lateral wall of the inferior meatus, and supplies the mucous membrane of the anterior part of the inferior meatus and the floor of the nasal cavity, communicating with the nasal branches from the sphenopalatine ganglion.

Dental considerations for this nerve are important. The anterior superior alveolar usually innervates all anterior teeth, loops backwards to join the middle superior alveolar nerve to form the superior dental plexus.

See also
 Anterior superior alveolar arteries
 Alveolar nerve (Dental nerve)
 Superior alveolar nerve (Superior dental nerve)
 Middle superior alveolar nerve (Middle superior dental nerve)
 Posterior superior alveolar nerve (Posterior superior dental nerve)
 Inferior alveolar nerve (Inferior dental nerve)

References

External links
 
 

Maxillary nerve